New Kids is a Dutch comedy sketch show about a group of anti-social youths from Maaskantje, a village in the southern province of North Brabant.

Later, it was picked up by 101 TV and Comedy Central. It was named New Kids on the Block for the first two seasons.

The show became highly popular in both the Netherlands and Germany and spawned two full-length movies, New Kids Turbo and New Kids Nitro.

Most of the locations shot in New Kids are filmed in the nearby village of Den Dungen.

The main characters habitually use the word 'kut' (Dutch slang for vagina), usually at the end of a sentence.

Overview 

The series follows the misadventures of a group of young men, who live in the small village of Maaskantje in North Brabant. Maaskantje's distinctly rustic and pleasant appearance as a traditional village is juxtaposed by the actions of the group, who are antisocial and indulge in the 'Gabber' culture. They drink excessively, eat junkfood and ride noisily around the village in a garish Opel Manta. Just about every sentence they speak is mindlessly punctuated by the expletive 'kut' ('cunt', in Dutch this word doesn't carry the same severity as it does in English, although it is nevertheless considered rude). Although most of the characters work, none of them appear particularly adept in their jobs.

Visually, the group displays a terrible understanding of fashion-sense and have dated hairstyles.

Despite their antisocial and immature mentality, the group rarely exhibits any serious malicious intent in their actions; much of the humor in the series is derived from the absurdity of the characters' lack of intelligence or even common sense.

A particularly distinct feature of the main characters is the presence of a heavy, somewhat exaggerated Brabantian dialect, which is especially noticeable in the characters' pronunciation of 'jongen' (dude, guy). In the German dubbing the actors voice themselves with a heavy Dutch accent.

Main characters

References

External links

Dutch comedy television series
2007 Dutch television series debuts
Sint-Michielsgestel